Oehlenschlager Bluff is a steep rock bluff overlooking Hull Glacier from the north. It marks the southwest extremity of Erickson Bluffs and McDonald Heights in Marie Byrd Land. Mapped by United States Geological Survey (USGS) from surveys and U.S. Navy air photos, 1959–65. Named by Advisory Committee on Antarctic Names (US-ACAN) for Richard J. Oehlenschlager, member of the biological party that made population studies of seals, whales, and birds in the pack ice of the Bellingshausen and Amundsen Seas using USCGC Southwind and its two helicopters, 1971–72.

See also
Mount Petrides

References

Cliffs of Marie Byrd Land